Richard Franz Joseph Heuberger (18 June 1850 in Graz, Austria – 28 October 1914 in Vienna, Austria) was an Austrian composer of operas and operettas, a music critic, and teacher.

Heuberger was born in Graz, the son of a bandage manufacturer. He initially studied engineering, but gave it up in 1876, and turned to music. He studied at the Graz Conservatory (where he studied with Robert Fuchs), and later transferred to Vienna, where he eventually became the chorus master of the Wiener Akademischer Gesangverein, conductor of the Wiener Singakademie, director of the Wiener Männergesang-Verein (Vienna Men's Choral Association), and a teacher at the Konservatorium der Stadt Wien. 

As a music critic he wrote for the Neues Wiener Tagblatt from 1881, the Allgemeine Zeitung in Munich from 1889, and (succeeding Hanslick) on the Neue Freie Presse from 1896 until 1901. He also edited the Musikbuch aus Österreich (1904–6).

Although Heuberger wrote many operas, ballets, choral works, and songs, he is best known today for his operetta Der Opernball, which he composed in 1898.
He taught at the Vienna Conservatory from 1902. Among his pupils was Clemens Krauss.

Selected works
Operettas
Der Opernball (1898)
Ihre Excellenz (1899), revised as Eine entzückende Frau
Der Sechsuhrzug (1900)
Das Baby (1902)
Der Fürst von Düsterstein (1909)
Don Quixote (1910)

Operas
Abenteuer einer Neujahrsnacht (1886)
Manuel Venegas (1889), revised as Mirjam, oder Das Maifest (1894)
Barfüssele (1905)

Ballets
Die Lautenschlägerin (1896)
Struwwelpeter (1897)

References

External links 
 
 Biography
  (Another good biography)
 
 
 Songs by Richard Heuberger on The Art Song Project

1850 births
1914 deaths
19th-century classical composers
20th-century classical composers
Austrian male classical composers
Austrian music critics
Austrian opera composers
Austrian Romantic composers
Male opera composers
Musicians from Graz
Pupils of Wilhelm Mayer (composer)
20th-century male musicians
19th-century male musicians